NUGS, officially The National Union of Ghana Students is the largest student organization in Ghana. However the date of it foundation has been the subject of controversy. The official Facebook page suggests 1964. However Professor Anselmus Kludze, father of Ave Kludze, claimed that he was the National President of NUGS for the period 1962–1963. He stated he was preceded by P.D. Vanderpuije of the University of Science and Technology (UST) and followed by Mr. F.Y.I. Fiagbe, also of the UST. He further claims that both he and Fiagbe, along with Antwi (the General Secretary at the time), Mr. Easmon and Mr. Kodwo Carr were all arrested and imprisoned without trial under the Preventive Detention Act.

The organisation can trace its origins to the Union of Gold Coast Students in West Africa which was founded in the 1930s. Originally the Union had as one of its aims an end to British colonial rule and the achievement independence.

See also

 Education in Ghana

References

1964 establishments in Ghana
Education in Ghana
Educational organizations based in Africa
Youth organisations based in Ghana
Student organizations established in 1964
Students' unions